Jeriskhan (also Romanized as Jerīskhān) is a village in Derakhtengan Rural District, in the Central District of Kerman County, Kerman Province, Iran. At the 2006 census, its population was 32, in 9 families.

References 

Populated places in Kerman County